Egnund Chapel is a chapel of the Church of Norway in Folldal Municipality in Innlandet county, Norway. It is located in the village of Einabu. It is an annex chapel for the Folldal parish which is part of the Nord-Østerdal prosti (deanery) in the Diocese of Hamar. The brown, wooden chapel was built in an rectangular design in 1975 using plans drawn up by the architect Ingri Stein. The chapel seats about 60 people.

History
In 1922, a new cemetery was constructed at Einabu to serve the people living in the area. During the 1970s, planning began for a new chapel to be built at the cemetery. Ingri Stein designed the small, rectangular log building. It was built and consecrated in 1975. It was built along the border of Folldal and Alvdal municipalities since they formed a single church parish for many years. The church was given as a gift to the two municipalities by Magne and Wilhelmine Louise Mortenson.

See also
List of churches in Hamar

References

Folldal
Churches in Innlandet
Rectangular churches in Norway
Wooden churches in Norway
20th-century Church of Norway church buildings
Churches completed in 1975
1975 establishments in Norway